Sangeetha Bhat is an Indian actress. She predominantly appears in Kannada films and has also acted in Tamil and Telugu films.

Career 
Before taking on movie roles, Bhat appeared on television series with Panjaradha Gili (Kasturi channel Kannada), Bhagyavantharu (Suvarna channel Kannada), Chandrachakori (Udaya TV Kannada), Neeli (Suvarna channel Kannada), and Chandramukhi (Kasturi channel Kannada). Also, a reality TV show Life Super Guru (Zee Kannada channel), BCL (Suvarna Plus).
She began her film career in Preethi Geethi Ityaadi in 2014, where she was given the lead role alongside Pawan Wadeyar. Since then, she appeared in Doo, Kaaki / Ka Ka Ka a Telugu/Tamil bilingual, and Maamu Tea Angadi, Bhat was featured in the Tamil movie titled Aarambamae Attagasam, but in 2017 more successful films such as Eradane Sala and Dayavittu Gamanisu came her way. Eradane Sala was appreciated by her fans because of her uncharacteristically bold performance. In Dayavittu Gamanisi, she starred with Vasishta N. Simha, portraying a teacher. The movie was critically acclaimed and nominated for SIIMA.

She played the lead role in the movie Kismath, along with Vijay Raghavendra, Anukta, directed and produced by a talented Mangalorean team was also a critically acclaimed film. Her upcoming movies are Alidu Ulidavaru and Kapata Nataka Paathradhari (2018-2019-2020). 
Sangeetha Bhat is known for her expressions and natural acting that connects to people and also known to be the critically acclaimed actress in the Kannada film industry. The actress also produced and acted in the short movie named Conversation from her own production house "Scrabble Productions", along with her husband Sudarshan Rangaprasad.

Filmography
All films are in Kannada, unless otherwise noted.

Films

Television 
Chandra Chakori
Bhagyavantharu
Neeli
Chandramukhi
Life Super Guru
yediyur shree siddhalingeshwara
''

Short movies 
"Conversation" (2018)

Controversy
On 14 October 2018, through a three-page revelation, she kick-started the #MeToo movement in the Kannada film industry. Various celebrities came out in support, which led to further revelations.

References 

Living people
Indian film actresses
Actresses in Tamil cinema
Actresses in Kannada cinema
Actresses from Karnataka
1992 births